The abbreviation BEIC may refer to:
Biblioteca europea di informazione e cultura, a project in Milan, Italy
East India Company, aka the British East India Company, a former British joint stock company
British Egg Industry Council, an organisation set up in 1986 to represent the British egg industry